Celtidia is a genus of fungi in the family Zopfiaceae. This is a monotypic genus, containing the single species Celtidia duplicispora.

References

External links
Index Fungorum

Pleosporales
Monotypic Dothideomycetes genera